Peridermium californicum is a fungal plant pathogen infecting sunflowers.

References

External links 
Index Fungorum
USDA ARS Fungal Database

Fungal plant pathogens and diseases
Sunflower diseases
Teliomycotina
Fungi described in 1914